Year 1408 (MCDVIII) was a leap year starting on Sunday (link will display the full calendar) of the Julian calendar.

Events 
 January–December 
 February 19 – Battle of Bramham Moor: A royalist army defeats the last remnants of the Percy Rebellion.
 September – Henry, Prince of Wales (later Henry V of England) retakes Aberystwyth from Owain Glyndŵr.
 September 16 – Thorstein Olafssøn marries Sigrid Bjørnsdatter in Hvalsey Church, in the last recorded event of the Norse history of Greenland.
 December 5 – Emir Edigu of the Golden Horde reaches Moscow.
 December 13 – The Order of the Dragon is founded under King Sigismund of Hungary.

 Date unknown 
 The Moldavian town of Iaşi is first mentioned.
 The Yongle Encyclopedia is completed.
 Gotland passes under Danish rule.
 Zheng He delivers 300 virgins from Korea to the Chinese emperor.
 Mihail I becomes co-ruler of Wallachia, with his father Mircea cel Bătrân.

Births 
 January 25 – Katharina of Hanau, German countess regent (d. 1460)
 February 14 – John FitzAlan, 14th Earl of Arundel (d. 1435)
 March 25 – Agnes of Baden, Countess of Holstein-Rendsburg, German noble (d. 1473)
 April 8 – Jadwiga of Lithuania, Polish princess (d. 1431)
 April 23 – John de Vere, 12th Earl of Oxford, English noble (d. 1462)
 May 22 – Annamacharya, Indian mystic saint composer (d. 1503)
 October 1 or 1409 – Karl Knutsson, King of Sweden (d. 1470)

Deaths 
 February 19 – Thomas Bardolf, 5th Baron Bardolf, English rebel (in battle)
 February 20 – Henry Percy, 1st Earl of Northumberland, English rebel (in battle) (b. 1342)
 April – Miran Shah, son of Timur the Lame (b. 1366)
 April 10 or April 11 – Elizabeth le Despenser, English noblewoman
 May 24 – Taejo of Joseon, ruler of Korea (b. 1335) 
 May 31 – Ashikaga Yoshimitsu, Japanese shōgun (b. 1358)
 September 15 – Edmund Holland, 4th Earl of Kent (b. 1384)
 September 22 – John VII Palaiologos, Byzantine Emperor (b. 1370)
 December 4 – Valentina Visconti, Duchess of Orléans by marriage to Louis of Valois, Duke of Orléans
 date unknown – Coptic Pope Matthew I of Alexandria

References